Manish Suresh Shah (born November 3, 1972) is a United States district judge of the United States District Court for the Northern District of Illinois and former Assistant United States Attorney for the same court.

Biography
Born in New York City, Shah received a Bachelor of Arts degree, cum laude, in 1994 from Stanford University. He received a Juris Doctor, cum laude, in 1998 from the University of Chicago Law School. He worked as an associate at the law firm of Heller, Ehrman, White & McAuliffe in San Francisco, California, from 1998 to 1999. He served as a law clerk to Judge James B. Zagel of the United States District Court for the Northern District of Illinois from 1999 to 2001. He served as an Assistant United States Attorney in the Northern District of Illinois from 2001–2014. He served as Deputy Chief of the General Crimes Section from 2007 to 2008, Deputy Chief of the Financial Crimes & Special Prosecutions Section from 2008 to 2011, Chief of Criminal Appeals from 2011 to 2012 and previously served as Chief of the Criminal Division.

Federal judicial service
Shah was recommended to fill a judicial vacancy on the District Court for the Northern District of Illinois by Republican Senator Mark Kirk. On September 19, 2013, President Barack Obama nominated Shah to the seat vacated by Judge Joan Lefkow, who assumed senior status on September 1, 2012. On January 16, 2014 his nomination was reported out of committee. On April 11, 2014 Senate Majority Leader Reid filed a motion to invoke cloture on the nomination. On April 29, 2014 a vote on the motion to invoke cloture on the nomination was agreed to by a 57–40 vote. On April 30, 2014, his nomination was confirmed by a 95–0 vote. He received his commission on May 1, 2014.

See also
List of Asian American jurists
List of first minority male lawyers and judges in Illinois

References

External links

1972 births
Living people
American jurists of Indian descent
Assistant United States Attorneys
Illinois lawyers
Judges of the United States District Court for the Northern District of Illinois
Stanford University alumni
United States district court judges appointed by Barack Obama
University of Chicago Law School alumni
21st-century American judges